Langwith is a former railway station in the Langwith Maltings area of Langwith in north eastern Derbyshire, England.

Context
The station was built by the Midland Railway on its Nottingham Midland to Worksop line. The station was designed by the Midland Railway company architect John Holloway Sanders. The line and station were closed to passengers in 1964. The line was reopened in 1998 as the Robin Hood Line but the station was not reopened, the community being better served by a wholly new structure half a mile to the North, called Langwith-Whaley Thorns. In Henry Priestley's wonderfully evocative 1962 photograph of Langwith station the colliery winding gear visible in the distance marks the approximate site of Langwith-Whaley Thorns station.

History
The station was opened with some bunting, flags and ceremony on 1 June 1875. It initially provided a service of six trains each way, three between Mansfield and Worksop and three between Mansfield and Sheffield Victoria.

The line was and remains double track. The station had two opposite platforms and a stone station building very similar to those at Shirebrook West, Elmton & Creswell and Whitwell. The original Whitwell station has been dismantled and meticulously rebuilt at the Midland Railway Centre, the new Robin Hood line Whitwell station is a new building on the original site.

The last day of service was 10 October 1964, closure having been delayed for a week to serve the annual Nottingham Goose Fair. The station was demolished in 1978.

Notes

References

Further reading

See also
Langwith-Whaley Thorns railway station
Shirebrook North railway station

External links
The station on an Edwardian 6" OS map, via National Library of Scotland
The station on a navigable 1947 OS Map, via npe Maps
The station, line and mileages, via Railway Mileages

Disused railway stations in Derbyshire
Former Midland Railway stations
Railway stations in Great Britain opened in 1875
Railway stations in Great Britain closed in 1964
Beeching closures in England
John Holloway Sanders railway stations